Neoepinnula is a genus of snake mackerels, also known as sackfish.

Species
There are currently 3 recognized species in this genus:
 Neoepinnula americana (M. G. Grey, 1953) (American sackfish)
 Neoepinnula minetomai Nakayama, Y. Kimura & Endo, 2014 (Large-eyed sackfish) 
 Neoepinnula orientalis (Gilchrist & von Bonde, 1924) (Sackfish)

References

Gempylidae